The discography of Waka Flocka Flame, an American rapper, consists of two studio albums, 41 singles and 28 mixtapes. His highest-charting single, "No Hands" featuring Roscoe Dash and Wale, peaked at number 13 on the US Billboard Hot 100.

Albums

Studio albums

Collaboration albums

Mixtapes

Singles

As lead artist

As featured artist

Other charted songs

Guest appearances
{| class="wikitable plainrowheaders" style="text-align:center;"
|+ List of non-single guest appearances, with other performing artists, showing year released and album name
! scope="col" style="width:20em;" | Title
! scope="col" | Year
! scope="col" | Other artist(s)
! scope="col" | Album
|-
! scope="row"| "Same Shit" (Remix)
| rowspan="9"| 2009
| Slim Dunkin, OJ Da Juiceman
| rowspan="4"| Built for Interrogation
|-
! scope="row"| "80's Baby" 
| Slim Dunkin, D-Bo, Dae Dae
|-
! scope="row"| "I Love" 
| Slim Dunkin, B.Geezy
|-
! scope="row"| "I Got It" 
| Slim Dunkin, Lil Cap, B.Geezy 
|-
! scope="row"| "Lord I'm Tired"
| Frenchie
| rowspan="3"| Chicken Room 
|-
! scope="row"| "What You Reppin'"
| Frenchie, Gucci Mane, Wooh Da Kid, Slim Dunkin
|-
! scope="row"| "Brand New"
| Frenchie, Gucci Mane
|-
! scope="row"| "Wasted" (Remix)
| Gucci Mane
| Lebron Flocka James
|-
! scope="row"| "Bingo" 
| Gucci Mane, Soulja Boy
| The State vs. Radric Davis
|-
! scope="row"| "Coca Cola" 
| rowspan="16"| 2010
| Gucci Mane, Rocko, OJ Da Juiceman, Shawty Lo, Yo Gotti, Nicki Minaj
| rowspan="2"| Burrrprint (2) HD
|-
! scope="row"| "Shining For No Apparent Reason" 
| Gucci Mane, Schife, Wooh Da Kid
|-
! scope="row"| "Flex" (Remix)
| Party Boyz, T-Pain
| The Re-Up 11
|-
! scope="row"| "I'm Just Chillin" 
| Ocoop, Jim Jones
| 
|-
! scope="row"| "Stove Music" 
| Gucci Mane, Yo Gotti
| rowspan="2"| Mr. Zone 6
|-
! scope="row"| "You Know What It Is" 
| Gucci Mane 
|-
! scope="row"| "Throw It Up Pt. 2" 
| Lil Jon, Pastor Troy
| Crunk Rock
|-
! scope="row"| "Young Thad" 
| Young Thad
| 
|-
! scope="row"| "Lock My CEO" 
| Gudda Gudda
| Back 2 Guddaville
|-
! scope="row"| "Grind" 
| J-Bar
| Grind Star
|-
! scope="row"| "All Dem Boys" 
| Jasmyn, Roscoe Dash
| 
|-
! scope="row"| "Hands Up, Lay Down" 
| Twista 
| The Perfect Storm
|-
! scope="row"| "Get 'Em" 
| Game
| Brake Lights
|-
! scope="row"| "So Crazy" (Remix)
| Fred the Godson, Cam'ron
| Armageddon
|-
! scope="row"| "Pattycake" 
| Gucci Mane
| rowspan="2" 
|-
! scope="row"| "Do Ya Dance" (Remix) 
| Qu1k, OJ Da Juiceman
|-
! scope="row"| "Blow Your Ass Off" 
| rowspan="21"| 2011
| Yo Gotti, Zed Zilla, Starlito
| Cocaine Musik 5: White Friday
|-
! scope="row"| "Den't Be Mad at Me" (Remix)
| Frenchie, Haitian Fresh, Murdah Baby
| New Atlanta
|-
! scope="row"| "I Don't Care" (Remix)
|Josh Xantus, Ace Hood
| 
|-
! scope="row"| "Puttin' In Work"
| YG Hootie
| rowspan="2"| Fonk Love: Flight to Da Motherland
|-
! scope="row"| "Everything Bricksquad"
| YG Hootie, Wooh Da Kid, Frenchie
|-
! scope="row"| "This Is What I Do" 
| Gucci Mane, OJ Da Juiceman
| rowspan="3"| The Return of Mr. Zone 6
|-
! scope="row"| "Pancakes" 
| Gucci Mane, 8Ball
|-
! scope="row"| "Trick or Treat" 
| Gucci Mane, Slim Dunkin,  Wooh Da Kid
|-
! scope="row"| "I'm Thuggin" 
| DJ Khaled, Ace Hood
| rowspan="2"| We the Best Forever
|-
! scope="row"| "Welcome To My Hood" (Remix)
| DJ Khaled, Ludacris, T-Pain, Busta Rhymes, Twista, Mavado, Ace Hood, Fat Joe, Game, Jadakiss, Bun B
|-
! scope="row"| "Annoying" 
| Young Scooter, Future
| Fitnessin' & Flexin|-
! scope="row"| "Wild Boy" 
| MGK
| Half Naked & Almost Famous
|-
! scope="row"| "Pump Fake" 
| Paper Boy, Boss Kane, Playmaker
| Paper Route
|-
! scope="row"| "White Sheets" 
| Tony Yayo, Yo Gotti
|  Meyer Lansky
|-
! scope="row"| "My Benz"
| Wooh Da Kid, Ice Burgandy, P Smurf
| rowspan="3"| Krown The King
|-
! scope="row"| "All I Ever Wanted"
| rowspan="2"| Wooh Da Kid, Slim Dunkin
|-
! scope="row"| "Put Your Hands Up"
|-
! scope="row"| "Go Hard"
| rowspan="2"| Yung Joey
| rowspan="4"| The 6th Man
|-
! scope="row"| "Bullshit"
|-
! scope="row"| "Banned from the Club"
| Yung Joey, Slim Dunkin
|-
! scope="row"| "9 AM"
| Yung Joey, Wooh Da Kid
|-
! scope="row"| "They Scared" 
| rowspan="35"| 2012
| Prodigy, Havoc
| H.N.I.C. 3: The Mixtape
|-
! scope="row"| "For My Niggaz" 
| P Smurf, Eldorado Red
| Big Ol Pimp Talk
|-
! scope="row"| "All That Ass" 
| Ja-Bar
| #TOKE Vol. 1
|-
! scope="row"| "Bad Bitch" 
| Red Café, French Montana
|Hells Kitchen
|-
! scope="row"| "Do It" 
| Veli Sosa
| Mr.500
|-
! scope="row"| "Walking Lick" 
| Gucci Mane
| Trap Back
|-
! scope="row"| "Drop It On Me" 
| Kali Kash
| 
|-
! scope="row"| "Money Made Her"
| Wooh Da Kid, Slug Mania
| rowspan="3"| Strap-A-Holics 2.0: Reloaded
|-
! scope="row"| "Bricksquad Diva"
| Wooh Da Kid, Slim Dunkin, Gucci Mane
|-
! scope="row"| "Ya Boy"
| Wooh Da Kid, Bo Deal
|-
! scope="row"| "Death Around the Corner"
| Ice Burgandy, Wooh Da Kid
| Progress Involves Risk Unfortunately
|-
! scope="row"| "Back To The Money" 
| Jadakiss, Slim Dunkin, French Montana
| Consignment
|-
! scope="row"| "Gun Clappin Reloaded" 
| Bo Deal, Red Zilla
| rowspan="3"| The Chicago Code 3: Revelations
|-
! scope="row"| "Murda" 
| Bo Deal, Chief Keef
|-
! scope="row"| "Wow" (Remix)
| Bo Deal, Twista, French Montana, Trae tha Truth
|-
! scope="row"| "Loyal"
| Richie Wess, Gucci Mane 
| J.O.B. (Joint Ova Blunts)
|-
! scope="row"| "Coppin'"
| Jarvis
| Heartache
|-
! scope="row"| "Real Niggas Stay Fly"
| Yung Joey, Fly-Ty, Fred the Godson
| rowspan="2"| Along Came Molly
|-
! scope="row"| "Mr. Fix It"
| Yung Joey, Tavoria
|-
! scope="row"| "I Got Em"
| Trae tha Truth
| Tha Blackprint
|-
! scope="row"| "Don't Be Mad"
| Ransom, Murdah Baby
| Winter’s Coming
|-
! scope="row"| "Spazz Out"
| Chill Will
| Real Shit
|-
! scope="row"| "I’ma Hata"
| DJ Drama, Tyler, The Creator, D-Bo
| Quality Street Music
|-
! scope="row"| "Crazy" 
| rowspan="2"| Gucci Mane
| rowspan="4"| Trap God
|-
! scope="row"| "Baby Wipes"
|-
! scope="row"| "Rolly Up"
| Gucci Mane, Young Scooter
|-
! scope="row"| "Fuck Something"
| Gucci Mane, Kirko Bangz, Young Scooter
|-
! scope="row"| "Suited Booted"
| Frenchie, Ice Burgandy
| Concrete Jungle 2
|-
! scope="row"| "Fuck Da Police"
| Ice Burgandy
| rowspan="2"| Rhythm & Burgandy
|-
! scope="row"| "Love Me Hate Me "
| Ice Burgandy, French Montana
|-
! scope="row"| "Red On"
| Bloody Jay, S.O.N.Y.
| Blatlanta (Bigger Than Rap)
|-
! scope="row"| "Champion"
|Trav
| Push
|-
! scope="row"| "Dog Pound"
| Mac Miller
| 
|-
! scope="row"| "Pretty Flacko" (Remix)
|ASAP Rocky, Gucci Mane, Pharrell
| Long. Live. ASAP 
|-
! scope="row"| "Numbers"
| Young Chris 
| The Introduction Tape
|-
! scope="row"| "Can I Freak"
| rowspan="31"| 2013
| MN Fats
| 
|-
! scope="row"| "Good Girl Bad Bitch"
| D-Dash
| Mill B4 Dinner Time
|-
! scope="row"| "Breakfast"
| Gucci Mane, PeeWee Longway
| Trap God 2
|-
! scope="row"| "The Man"
| Chaz Gotti
| rowspan="2"| Voice of Dunk
|-
! scope="row"| "Ain't Right"
| Chaz Gotti, D Dash
|-
! scope="row"| "Backseat"
| Gucci Mane, Chief Keef
| 
|-
! scope="row"| "Remix Rerock"
| Gucci Mane, Young Scooter
| Free Bricks 2
|-
! scope="row"| "We Don't Fuck Wit That"
| Kazzie
| 
|-
! scope="row"| "King Pin"
| Gucci Mane, PeeWee Longway, Young Dolph
| Money, Pounds, Ammunition
|-
! scope="row"| "No Lackin"
| Funkmaster Flex, Lil Reese, Wale
| rowspan="2"|Who You Mad At? Me or Yourself?
|-
! scope="row"| "Rich Gang"
| Funkmaster Flex
|-
! scope="row"| "Trap N Roll"
| Wyclef Jean, Angelica Salem
| April Showers
|-
! scope="row"| "Dead Man"
| SBOE, One Shot
| All We Got Is Us
|-
! scope="row"| "They Gon’ Hate Us Anyway"
| Maino, The Mafia
| 
|-
! scope="row"| "Long Over Due"
| Frenchie
| Long Overdue
|-
! scope="row"| "MWZC"
| DJ Scream, Gucci Mane, Project Pat
| The Ratchet Superior
|-
! scope="row"| "Vanity"
| 360
| Beginning of Forever
|-
! scope="row"| "Work"
| A-Wax, Cashis
| Jesus Malverde
|-
! scope="row"| "New York City"
| Uncle Murda, Vado
| rowspan="2" 
|-
! scope="row"| "G Rind" (Remix)
| Papoose, Gunplay
|-
! scope="row"| "Murda Something"
| ASAP Ferg
| Trap Lord
|-
! scope="row"| "Embalming Fluid"
| rowspan="4"| Gucci Mane
| rowspan="4"| World War 3: Gas
|-
! scope="row"| "Geekin"
|-
! scope="row"| "Picture That"
|-
! scope="row"| "What You Mean"
|-
! scope="row"| "Don't Trust"
| Gucci Mane, Young Scooter
| World War 3: Lean
|-
! scope="row" | "Miley"
| DJ Holiday, Wiz Khalifa
| 
|-
! scope="row"|"Nights Like This"
| Gucci Mane
| rowspan="2"| Diary of a Trap God
|-
! scope="row"| "Choppers"
| Gucci Mane, OG Boo Dirty,Young Dolph,Young Scooter
|-
! scope="row"| "Trap Rap"
| Hardo
| Pistolvania George
|-
! scope="row"| "Havana"
| Peter Jackson, Bianca
| Good Company
|-
! scope="row"| "Tolerated"
| rowspan="2"| 2014
| Girl Talk, Freeway
| Broken Ankles EP
|-
! scope="row"| "Slide Thru" (Remix)
| Rayven Justice
| I Have a Dream
|-
! scope="row"| "Can't Trust Thots" (Remix)
| rowspan="5"| 2015 
| Wash
| rowspan="3" 
|-
! scope="row"| "It G Ma" (Remix)
| Keith Ape, A$AP Ferg, Father, Dumbfoundead
|-
! scope="row"| "Nightlife"
| Jack-P
|-
! scope="row"| "Apeshit"
| Prof
| Liability
|-
! scope="row"| "UFC (Tap-Out)"
| Busta Rhymes, Gucci Mane
| The Return of the Dragon (The Abstract Went On Vacation)
|-
! scope="row"| "Chips"
| rowspan="1"| 2017
| Talib Kweli
| Radio Silence
|-
! scope="row"| "2 Sides of the Game"
| rowspan="3"| 2018
| Lecrae, Zaytoven, K-So
| Let the Trap Say Amen
|-
! scope="row"| "Elbows"
| B.o.B, Amara La Negra
| NAGA
|-
! scope="row"| "Break Your Back"
| Purari
| Ones To Watch - Eagle EP
|-
! scope="row"| "Where I'm From"
| rowspan="1"| 2019
| Rayven Justice
| ESO
|-
|}

Music videos

NotesA'''  "Hard in da Paint" did not enter the Billboard'' Hot 100, but peaked at number 11 on the Bubbling Under Hot 100 Singles chart.

References 

Discographies of American artists
Hip hop discographies